An antedated contract is a contract whose date is in the past; formally, a contract where the effective date on the contract is prior to the date on which the contract is executed (written, signed, made effective). The term is from Latin ante meaning "before", and its antonym is postdate. Another example, in simpler terms, might be that if something antedates something else, it predates it, or is older than it.

See antedated check for ante.

See also 
 Antedated check

Legal terminology